Lee Ji-hun (born 24 March 1994) is a South Korean football defender who plays for Gwangju FC in the top tier of professional football in South Korea, the K League 1. He has previously played for Suwon FC, Incheon United FC, and Ulsan Hyundai FC.

Club career
Born on 24 March 1994, Lee made his debut for Ulsan Hyundai FC on 19 November 2017, playing against Gangwon FC in the K League 1. He moved to Incheon United FC in July 2019 on loan. He transferred to Suwon FC for the 2020 season of the K League 2, playing 21 league games that year. For the 2021 season, he moved to Gwangju FC, playing in the K League 1

Club career statistics

Honors and awards

Player
Ulsan Hyundai FC
 Korean FA Cup Winners (1) : 2017

References

1994 births
Living people
Association football defenders
South Korean footballers
Ulsan Hyundai FC players
Incheon United FC players
Suwon FC players
Gwangju FC players
K League 1 players